Marilyn Hanold (born June 9, 1938) is an American model and actress.

Biography
Hanold was Playboy magazine's Playmate of the Month for its June 1959 issue. Her centerfold was photographed by Bruno Bernard.

Hanold was the second of six children and is of German ancestry.  Her father was a lieutenant with the New York City police.

Hanold appeared in a number of films and television programs in the late 1950s and throughout the 1960s.

She was married to Rulon Keaton Neilson, president of Skyline Oil Company from 1967 until his 1993 death at the age of 83. They had three children, Elisabeth R (b. 1969), Sabrina C (b. 1971) and Valerie M.

Filmography
 The Solid Gold Cadillac (1956) (uncredited) as Miss L'Arriere
 Back from Eternity (1956) (uncredited) casino showgirl
 Official Detective - "The Brunette" (as Marilyn Harold)
 Space Ship Sappy (1957) as Amazon
 The Garment Jungle (1957) (uncredited) as Model
 Operation Mad Ball (1957) (uncredited) as Lt. Tweedy
 The Sad Sack (1957) (uncredited) as Sexy Female
 Submarine Seahawk (1958) (scenes deleted)
 I Married a Woman (1958) (uncredited) as Luxembourg Girl
 The Texan - "The Widow of Paradise" (1958) as Iris Crawford
 Have Gun - Will Travel - "The Man Who Lost" (1959) as She
 The Phil Silvers Show - "The Colonel's Second Honeymoon" (1959) as Lauren
 The Brain That Wouldn't Die (1962) as Peggy Howard
 Bewitched - "A Change of Face" (1965) as Michelle
 Frankenstein Meets the Spacemonster (1965) as Princess Marcuzan
 Batman
 "The Devil's Fingers" (1966) as Doe
 "The Dead Ringers" (1966) as Doe
 Felony Squad - "The Strangler" (1967) as Mrs. Selby
 In Like Flint (1967) as Amazon #8
 Run, Jack, Run (1970) (TV) as Girl

See also
 List of people in Playboy 1953–1959

References

External links
 
 

1938 births
Living people
People from Jamaica, Queens
1950s Playboy Playmates
Actresses from New York City
People from Queens, New York
21st-century American women